Williams & Glyn's Bank v Boland [1980] is a House of Lords judgment in English land and trusts law (family co-ownership) on an occupier's potentially overriding interests in a home.

Facts
Michael Boland and his wife Julia Sheila Boland lived on Ridge Park, Beddington, in the London Borough of Croydon. Mr Boland, registered owner of the house, borrowed money from Williams & Glyn's Bank for his building company. Boland failed to repay, and the bank sued for possession.

Mrs Boland argued that because she made substantial financial contributions to acquiring the home, she should be able to stay.

The bank argued:
Her rights did not qualify as a property right, basing its argument on the doctrine of conversion, and she should only get a share of any money made by her husband from the land, not a right enabling her to use it.
Even if there was a property right, the bank's defence was it registered its charge, and Mrs Boland's right was not registered.

The lack of registration defence/claim does not work if the party claiming the unregistered right is in actual occupation. Then, that person has an overriding interest. But the bank argued that if she cohabited with her husband, she should not count as being in actual occupation because a bank's (proper) investigation (as it then stood) would not alert it to her having a property right in the land. It would be no surprise to find a shared occupancy of a home.

Judgment

High Court
Templeman J at first instance, said that Mrs Boland was not in ‘actual occupation’ within the Act's meaning, because her occupation was merely an accompaniment to her husband's. Therefore, her claim failed. Mrs Boland appealed.

Court of Appeal
The Court of Appeal held that Mrs Boland succeeded in her claim. She was in actual occupation under section 70(1)(g) of the Land Registration Act 1925 and that therefore she had an overriding interest in the property. The bank appealed contending that the wife's interest could only be considered a minor interest and that she could not be considered to be "in actual occupation". Lord Denning MR, giving the leading judgment, remarked that spouses had been ‘stripped bare’ by the House of Lord's in National Provincial Bank Ltd v Ainsworth. Then in Gissing v Gissing it was decided that contributions to the purchase price mean a trust arises. He went on to refute the view of Stamp J in Caunce v Caunce and Templeman J at first instance, that a wife could certainly be in ‘actual occupation’ even though her husband owned and occupied the property. The key parts of his judgment were as follows.

House of Lords
The House of Lords upheld the Court of Appeal's decision and thus rejected the bank's application for possession. Mrs Boland's right(s) counted as a property right, and the bank had no defence. Lord Wilberforce held that the words ‘actual occupation’ under section 70(1)(g) of the Land Registration Act 1925 should be interpreted in plain English and did not require anything else but physical presence. The view that a husband's occupation (living there) precluded the wife's was wrong. Ditto a wife's occupation being "a shadow of her husband’s" similarly obsolete. And to say that actual occupation must be inconsistent with the husband's would be a ‘rewriting of the paragraph’. The rights of a spouse under a trust for sale are capable of recognition, if with difficulty, as overriding interests. He approved Lord Denning MR rejecting that the spouse's right was merely an interest in the proceeds of sale, rather than the house itself for living in it.

Lord Wilberforce said among his reasoning:

Cases overruled
Cedar Holdings Ltd v Green 1979 EWCA

Cases disapproved
Caunce v Caunce 1969 EWHC Ch D

Cases applied
Hodgson v Marks [1971] Ch 892; [1971] 2 WLR 1263; [1971] 2 All ER 684, EWCA
Elias v Mitchell [1972] Ch 652; [1972] 2 WLR 740; [1972] 2 All ER 153, EWHC Ch D
Bull v Bull [1955] 1 QB 234; [1955] 2 WLR 78; [1955] 1 All ER 253, EWCA

Cases considered
Irani Finance Ltd v Singh [1971] Ch 59; [1970] 3 WLR 330; [1970] 3 All ER 199, CA

Distinguished in
City of London Building Society v Flegg [1988] AC 54; HL (E&W)

See also

English land law
English family law

Notes and references
Notes

References

References
N Gravells (ed), Landmark Cases in Land Law (2013)

House of Lords cases
English property case law
1980 in British law
1980 in case law
English land case law